The United States Immigration and Naturalization Service (INS) was an agency of the U.S. Department of Labor from 1933 to 1940 and the U.S. Department of Justice from 1940 to 2003.

Referred to by some as former INS and by others as legacy INS, the agency ceased to exist under that name on March 1, 2003, when most of its functions were transferred to three new entities – U.S. Citizenship and Immigration Services (USCIS), U.S. Immigration and Customs Enforcement (ICE), and U.S. Customs and Border Protection (CBP) – within the newly created Department of Homeland Security (DHS), as part of a major government reorganization following the September 11 attacks of 2001.

Prior to 1933, there were separate offices administering immigration and naturalization matters, known as the Bureau of Immigration and the Bureau of Naturalization, respectively.  The INS was established on June 10, 1933, merging these previously separate areas of administration. In 1890, the federal government, rather than the individual states, regulated immigration into the United States, and the Immigration Act of 1891 established a Commissioner of Immigration in the Treasury Department.  Reflecting changing governmental concerns, immigration was transferred to the purview of the United States Department of Commerce and Labor after 1903 and the Department of Labor after 1913.  In 1940, with increasing concern about national security, immigration and naturalization was organized under the authority of the Department of Justice.

In 2003 the administration of immigration services, including permanent residence, naturalization, asylum, and other functions, became the responsibility of the Bureau of Citizenship and Immigration Services (BCIS), which existed under that name only for a short time before changing to its current name, U.S. Citizenship and Immigration Services (USCIS). The investigative and enforcement functions of the INS (including investigations, deportation, and intelligence) were combined with the U.S. Customs investigators to create U.S. Immigration and Customs Enforcement (ICE). The border functions of the INS, which included the Border Patrol and INS Inspectors, were combined with U.S. Customs Inspectors to create U.S. Customs and Border Protection (CBP).

Mission

The INS (Immigration and Naturalization Service) administered federal immigration laws and regulations including the Immigration and Nationality Act (Title 8, United States Code). Its officers inspected foreigners arriving at an official Port of Entry (POE), detecting and deterring illegal entry between the ports (with the assistance of the Border Patrol, a component of the INS) and by sea, and conducting investigations of criminal and administrative violations of the Act.  The INS also adjudicated applications for permanent residency ("green cards"), change of status, naturalization (the process by which an alien [foreign-born person] becomes a citizen), and similar matters.

Structure

At the head of the INS was a commissioner appointed by the President who reported to the Attorney General in the Department of Justice. The INS worked closely with the United Nations, the Department of State, and the Department of Health and Human Services. The INS was a very large and complex organization that had four main divisions—Programs, Field Operations, Policy and Planning, and Management—that were responsible for operations and management.

The operational functions of the INS included the Programs and Field Operations divisions. The Programs division was responsible for handling all the functions involved with enforcement and examinations, including the arrest, detaining, and deportation of illegal immigrants as well as controlling illegal and legal entry.

The Field Operations division was responsible for overseeing INS' many offices operating throughout the country and the world. The Field Operations division implemented policies and handled tasks for its three regional offices, which in turn oversaw 33 districts and 21 border areas throughout the country. Internationally, the Field Operations division oversaw the Headquarters Office of International Affairs which in turn oversaw 16 offices outside the country.

Managerial functions of the INS included the Policy and Planning and Management divisions. The Office of Policy and Planning coordinated all information for the INS and communicated with other cooperating government agencies and the public. The office was divided into three areas: the Policy Division; the Planning Division; and the Evaluation and Research Center. The second managerial division, called the Management division, was responsible for maintaining the overall mission of the INS throughout its many offices and providing administrative services to these offices. These duties were handled by the offices of Information Resources Management, Finance, Human Resources and Administration, and Equal Employment Opportunity.

History

Shortly after the U.S. Civil War, some states started to pass their own immigration laws, which prompted the U.S. Supreme Court to rule in 1876 that immigration was a federal responsibility. The Immigration Act of 1891 established an Office of the Superintendent of Immigration within the Treasury Department. This office was responsible for admitting, rejecting, and processing all immigrants seeking admission to the United States and for implementing national immigration policy. 'Immigrant Inspectors', as they were called then, were stationed at major U.S. ports of entry collecting manifests of arriving passengers. Its largest station was located on Ellis Island in New York harbor. Among other things, a 'head tax' of fifty cents was collected on each immigrant.

Paralleling some current immigration concerns, in the early 1900s Congress's primary interest in immigration was to protect American workers and wages: the reason it had become a federal concern in the first place. This made immigration more a matter of commerce than revenue. In 1903, Congress transferred the Bureau of Immigration to the newly created (now-defunct) Department of Commerce and Labor, and on June 10, 1933, the agency was established as the Immigration and Naturalization Service.

After World War I, Congress attempted to stem the flow of immigrants, still mainly coming from Europe, by passing a law in 1921 and the Immigration Act of 1924 limiting the number of newcomers by assigning a quota to each nationality based upon its representation in previous U.S. Census figures. Each year, the U.S. State Department issued a limited number of visas; only those immigrants who could present valid visas were permitted entry.

There were a number of predecessor agencies to INS between 1891 and 1933. The Immigration and Naturalization Service (INS) was formed in 1933 by a merger of  the Bureau of Immigration and the Bureau of Naturalization.

Both those bureaus, as well as the newly created INS, were controlled by the Department of Labor.
President Franklin Roosevelt moved the INS from the Department of Labor to the Department of Justice in 1940, citing a need for "more effective control over aliens" as the United States moved closer to joining World War II.

By July 1941, Justice Department officials had decided that the INS would oversee the internment of enemy aliens arrested by the FBI should the U.S. enter the war, and immediately after the attack on Pearl Harbor these plans went into effect. By December 10, three days after the attack, the INS had 1,291 Japanese, 857 German, and 147 Italian nationals in custody. These "enemy aliens," many of whom had resided in the United States for decades, were arrested without warrants or formal charges. They were held in immigration stations and various requisitioned sites, often for months, before receiving a hearing (without the benefit of legal counsel or defense witnesses) and being released, paroled, or transferred to a Department of Justice internment camp. Starting in 1942, the INS also interned German, Italian, and Japanese Latin Americans deported from Peru and other countries. It is estimated that 17,477 persons of Japanese ancestry, 11,507 of German ancestry, 2,730 of Italian ancestry, and 185 others were interned by the Immigration and Naturalization Service during the war.

In November 1979, Attorney General Benjamin Civiletti announced that INS "raids" would only take place at places of work, not at residences where illegal aliens were suspected of living.

Films

The work of the immigration service has been dramatized or depicted in literature, music, art, and theatre. Films using its work as a theme include The Immigrant (1917), The Strong Man 1926), Ellis Island (1936), Paddy O'Day (1936), Gateway (1938), Secret Service of the Air (1939), Exile Express (1939), Five Came Back (1939), Illegal Entry (1949), Deported (1950), Gambling House (1951), Coneheads (1993), Men in Black (1997), Fun with Dick and Jane (2005) and Ip Man 4: The Finale (2019).

See also

 U.S. Citizenship and Immigration Services
 U.S. Immigration and Customs Enforcement
 U.S. Customs and Border Protection
 Immigration
 Asylum in the United States
 Well-Founded Fear

References

External links
 Official Site (2000–2003) (Archive)
 History site
 Department of Homeland Security (DHS)
 U.S. Citizenship and Immigration Services (USCIS) of the DHS
 U.S. Immigration and Customs Enforcement (ICE) of the DHS
 U.S. Customs and Border Protection (CBP) of the DHS

Immigration to the United States
Defunct agencies of the United States government
Defunct federal law enforcement agencies of the United States
History of immigration to the United States
Government agencies disestablished in 2003
Government agencies established in 1933
1933 establishments in the United States
2003 disestablishments in the United States